Jari Niemi (born 2 February 1977 in Nokia) is a retired Finnish footballer. He has played for R.A.E.C. Mons, Standard Liège and K. Sint-Truidense V.V. in Belgium. In the Finnish Veikkausliiga Niemi has also played for TPV Tampere, FC Haka and Tampere United, and has won five Finnish championships. During the second qualifying round of the 2007/2008 Champions League edition, Niemi scored the only goal in Tampere's prestigious 1:0 away win against Bulgarian champions Levski Sofia. As Tampere had attained a 1:0 win in their home game, they became the first Finnish side to eliminate a Bulgarian club from the high-profile competition. However, the Finns were unable to qualify for the group stages of the Champions League, as they were eliminated by Norwegian side Rosenborg BK in the third qualifying round.

Niemi was able to play either as a right midfielder/winger or a striker.

References
Guardian Football
Veikkausliiga Hall of Fame

1977 births
Living people
People from Nokia, Finland
Finnish footballers
Finland international footballers
Veikkausliiga players
FC Haka players
Standard Liège players
Sint-Truidense V.V. players
R.A.E.C. Mons players
Tampere United players
Association football wingers
Sportspeople from Pirkanmaa